Bassire is a settlement in the Bignona Department of Ziguinchor Region in the Basse Casamance area of south-west  Senegal. At the 2002 census it had a population of 891.

References

External links
PEPAM

Populated places in the Bignona Department
Arrondissement of Tendouck
Casamance